Kaylani Lei (born Ashley Spalding) is an American pornographic actress.

Early life
Lei is of Chinese and Filipino descent.

Career
Lei danced at the Olympic Garden in Las Vegas prior to her porn career. She is a former contract performer for pornographic production studio Wicked Pictures.

Outside her adult film work, she was the host of a radio show on KSEX, Me So Horny with Kaylani Lei. Lei appeared on the Howard Stern radio show, and she has made appearances on Playboy TV. In 2007, she was the co star of the Cinemax series The Erotic Traveler, as "Allison Kraft" - an apprentice erotic photographer.  She appeared in one episode of the 2011 series Chemistry as a Japanese businesswoman named Yokushi Shimato.

In 2010, Lei appeared alongside fellow Wicked Pictures contract star Alektra Blue in the Free Speech Coalition's "All-Star Anti-Piracy PSA".

In 2011, Complex magazine ranked her at #24 in their list of "The Top 50 Hottest Asian Porn Stars of All Time".

Lei has also appeared several times on the TV series Zane's Sex Chronicles and in the 2013 documentary Risky Business: A Look Inside America's Adult Film Industry.

Personal life
Lei dated Byron Kelleher, a New Zealand rugby union halfback, from 2005 to 2006. She lived with him in New Zealand until June 2006.

Awards and nominations

References

External links

 
 
 
 
 

Year of birth missing (living people)
American female erotic dancers
American erotic dancers
American pornographic film actors of Chinese descent
American pornographic film actors of Filipino descent
Living people
Pornographic film actors from Massachusetts
Singaporean pornographic film actors
Singaporean emigrants to the United States
Singaporean people of Chinese descent
Singaporean people of Filipino descent
American pornographic film actresses
21st-century American women
American expatriates in New Zealand